The deep web is the part of the World Wide Web that is not indexed by traditional search engines.

Deep Web may also refer to:
 Deep Web (film), a 2015 documentary by Alex Winter
 Darknet, an overlay network
 Dark web, the part of the World Wide Web built on top of darknets
 "Deep Web", a song by Death Grips from No Love Deep Web